The Iskra 1030 was an Intel 8086 compatible personal computer produced in the USSR. It was designed by Elektronmash in Leningrad. The main manufacturers were the Iskra factory in Smolensk and the Shchyotmash factory in Kursk. The model line consisted of Iskra 1030.11 (basic), Iskra 1030М (modified), Iskra 1031, and Iskra 3104.

Specification 
The Iskra 1030M produced from 1989 comprised:

 CPU: K1810VM86 (Intel 8086 clone), 4.77 MHz
 RAM: 640 KB
 Display: color CGA compatible
 Floppy disk drive: 1×720 KB
 Hard disk drive: 20 MB
 Operating system: ADOS (Russian DOS, compatible with MS-DOS/PC DOS 2.x and 3.x), MS-DOS, CP/M-86
 Release Date: 1989

Software 
The computer was shipped with ADOS, a Russian version of MS-DOS/PC DOS 2.x and 3.x, a BASIC interpreter, the special language and interpreter for accounting calculations YAMB, the text editor R1. The operating system used the main code page, hardwired into the display ROM; it was compatible neither with CP 866 nor CP 855, although partially with ISO/IEC 8859-5.

See also 
 ES PEVM

External links 
 Sergei Frolov's Soviet Digital Electronics Museum
 Iskra 1030.11
 Iskra 1030M
 Iskra 1031
  Iskra 1030 (PC Museum)

References

Personal computers
Soviet computer systems